Xanthoparmelia schmidtii is a lichen which belongs to the Xanthoparmelia genus. The lichen is uncommon and is listed as endangered by the Nature Conservatory.

Description 
Grows on rocks and is about 4–8 cm in diameter with dark yellowish green lobes which are approximately 0.1-0.2 mm wide, 0.1-0.6 mm high. Moderately patchy rhizines on the underside that are 0.3-0.6mm long and are pale to dark brown in color. This species has the appearances of being a hybrid species as its chemical make up is unique to the foothill region of the Sierra Nevada

Habitat and range 
Found in the US state of California.

See also 

 List of Xanthoparmelia species

References 

schmidtii
Lichen species
Lichens of North America